Skuodas Manor is a former residential manor in Skuodas, Lithuania.

References

Manor houses in Lithuania
Classicism architecture in Lithuania